Carl Julius von Leypold (1806–1874) was a German Romantic landscape painter known for his painting, "Wanderer in the Storm".

Life 
Von Leypold studied landscape painting with Johan Christian Dahl at the Dresden Academy of Fine Arts between 1820 and 1829 . From 1826 onwards, Caspar David Friedrich influenced his choice of subjects and painting style. His landscapes are characterized by "a painterly, but at the same time sharp-brushed style, in which high painting culture is combined with Biedermeier objectivity."

On March 5, 1857, he became an honorary member of the Dresden Art Academy.

Works (selection) 

 City Gate in Grossenhain
 City Wall of Halle
 The Albrechtsburg in Meissen
 The Castle Ruins in the Snow

Watercolors

 Ruin in Winter
 Ruins of a Castle

Literature 

 Leypold, Karl Julius von. In: Friedrich von Boetticher: Painter works of the 19th century. Contribution to art history. Volume 1/2, sheets 31–61: Heideck – Mayer, Louis. Ms. v. Boetticher's Verlag, Dresden 1895, pp. 860–861 ( Textarchiv - Internet Archive ).
In: Hans Vollmer (Hrsg.): General lexicon of visual artists from antiquity to the present . Founded by Ulrich Thieme and Felix Becker . tape 23 : Leitenstorfer – Mander . EA Seemann, Leipzig 1929, p. 174 .
 Neidhardt: The painting of the romantic in Dresden. EA Seemann, Leipzig 1976.

References

1806 births
1874 deaths
German landscape painters
German romantic painters
Artists from Dresden
Dresden Academy of Fine Arts